This is a list of Virtual Console games that are available on Wii U in North America.

These releases take advantage of the console's unique features, such as Off TV Play with the Wii U GamePad and posting to Miiverse. Some of these games may already be available on the Wii Virtual Console, which can also be played through Wii U's Wii Mode, but these legacy versions lack some features of the Wii U Virtual Console. While Wii Virtual Console titles cannot be played using the Wii U GamePad's controls, a September 2013 system update enabled the use of the GamePad's screen as a display. While some Wii games are also available for download from the Wii U eShop, these are not designated as Virtual Console releases and lack Virtual Console features.

The list is sorted by system and in the order in which they were added in Nintendo eShop for Wii U. To sort by other columns, click the corresponding icon in the header row.

Available titles
The following is a list of the 311 games available on the Virtual Console for the Wii U in North America, sorted by system and in the order they were added in Nintendo eShop. To sort by other columns, click the corresponding icon in the header row.

Nintendo Entertainment System
These titles were originally released for use on the Nintendo Entertainment System, which was launched in 1985.

There are 94 games available to purchase.

Super Nintendo Entertainment System
These titles were originally released for use on the Super Nintendo Entertainment System, which was launched in 1991.

There are 51 games available to purchase.

Nintendo 64
These titles were originally released for use on the Nintendo 64, which was launched in 1996.

There are 21 games available to purchase.

Game Boy Advance
These titles were originally released for use on the Game Boy Advance (GBA), which was launched in 2001.

There are 74 games available to purchase.

Nintendo DS
These titles were originally released for use on the Nintendo DS, which was launched in 2004.

There are 31 games available to purchase.

TurboGrafx-16
These titles were originally released for use on the TurboGrafx-16, which was launched in 1989.

There are 33 games available to purchase.

See also 
 List of Virtual Console games for Wii (North America)
 List of Virtual Console games for Nintendo 3DS (North America)
 List of Wii games on Wii U eShop

References 

Video game lists by platform
Nintendo-related lists